Koło is one of the neighbourhoods of the Wola district of Warsaw, Poland. It is bounded to the north and west by the border with Bemowo, to the south by Górczewska Street and to the east by the Warsaw Circumferal railway line.

Neighbourhoods of Wola